Glen Ray Hines (October 26, 1943 – February 1, 2019) was an All-Pro (AFL) and NCAA All-American football player.

Early life
Hines was born on October 26, 1943, in El Dorado, Arkansas. He showed athletic prowess at a young age and was a two-sport standout in basketball and football at El Dorado High School. He played for head coach Garland Gregory, an Arkansas Hall of Fame football coach who also coached several other players who went on to play for the Arkansas Razorbacks, including fellow Arkansas All-Americans Jim Mooty and Wayne Harris.

College career
Hines played collegiately for the University of Arkansas Razorbacks from 1961 to 1965. In 1964, Hines was the anchor of an offensive line that helped Arkansas win its only National Championship in football, and in 1965, he was a consensus All-American. The Houston Post named Hines the Southwest Conference Most Outstanding Player for the 1965 season, a rare honor for a lineman. In 1994, he was selected as a member of the Razorback All-Century team. He was named a member of the Express News San Antonio, All-Time Southwest Conference Football First-team Offense in July 1989. Hines was later inducted into the Arkansas Razorback Sports Hall of Honor in 2001 and the Union County (Arkansas) Sports Hall of Fame in 2012. In October 2018, Hines was inducted into the Southwest Conference Sports Hall of Fame.

NFL career
Hines was drafted by the NFL's St. Louis Cardinals and the American Football League's Houston Oilers in 1965. In 1966, he signed with the Oilers and played for them until 1969 in the AFL, and, in 1970, in the NFL. He played the 1971–72 seasons with the New Orleans Saints, and retired after his final season with the Pittsburgh Steelers in 1973.

An accomplished pass blocker at a time when offensive linemen were severely restricted in the use of their hands to block pass rushers, he was an AFL All-Star game selection – the AFL version of the Pro Bowl – in 1968 and 1969.

A model of durability, from his first season in 1966 through his final season in 1973, Hines started and played in 115 consecutive NFL games, including three playoff games. In 2000, the Tulsa World named Hines to its Area Pro All-Century Team. In the December, 2005 issue of Football Digest, Hines was named to the All-Time Houston Oilers Team.

In 2020, the Arkansas media named Hines to its All Time Razorbacks in Pro Football Team. Out of 355 Razorbacks to have ever gone on to play in the NFL or AFL, Hines was placed in the top 14. In 2022, Sports Illustrated named Hines to its All-Time University of Arkansas NFL Team. Hines and Jason Peters (still active) were named the top two Razorback offensive tackles in school history to play in the NFL. Although a native of El Dorado, Arkansas, the University of Arkansas's first-ever All-American offensive tackle, a member of the All-Time Southwest Conference first-team offense, a member of the All-Time Houston Oilers team, one of the top two offensive tackles in Razorback history to play in the NFL as selected by Sports Illustrated, and one of the top 14 professional players in Razorback history as selected by the Arkansas sports media in 2020, Hines is nevertheless one of only three of those fourteen players and the only Arkansas native not elected to the Arkansas state Sports Hall of Fame.

Later life
Hines was diagnosed with advanced dementia due to his football career and donated his brain for post-mortem analysis to the Boston University CTE Center. Due to his declining neurological and physical condition, Hines was unable to attend his Southwest Conference Sports Hall of Fame induction ceremony held in November, 2018, and was represented by his son Wes and daughter Shelia, who accepted the award on his behalf. Hines would pass away only three months later.

In January, 2020, the Boston University CTE Center announced that Hines was diagnosed with stage 4 CTE, the most advanced and severe form of CTE. In articles published in Sports Illustrated, Medium, and on the Concussion Legacy Foundation's website, Hines’ son Glen, a former football and baseball player at Arkansas, Marine Corps Colonel, and author, described Hines’ physical and cognitive decline in his later years and how the family's efforts to secure funding for medical care and treatment under the National Football League's settlement with players - which were supported by the requisite diagnoses made by numerous board-certified doctors - were nevertheless intentionally drawn out, delayed, and belatedly rejected by the NFL in the months before Hines died in February, 2019. Hines' physical and cognitive decline from stage 4 CTE in his later years and the NFL's rejection of the family's claims for life-sustaining medical care and treatment under the designedly convoluted settlement process with former players were chronicled in the Welcome to the Machine podcast and book, both published in the fall, 2021.

See also
Other American Football League players

References

1943 births
2019 deaths
All-American college football players
American Football League All-Star players
American football offensive linemen
American football players with chronic traumatic encephalopathy
Arkansas Razorbacks baseball players
Arkansas Razorbacks football players
Houston Oilers players
New Orleans Saints players
People from El Dorado, Arkansas
Pittsburgh Steelers players
Houston Texans (WFL) players
American Football League players
Players of American football from Arkansas
Deaths from dementia in Arkansas